Alexander Sergeevich Stepanov (born 22 April 1991) is a Russian-born pair skater who competes for Belarus. With his skating partner, Bogdana Lukashevich, he is the 2020 Ice Star champion, the 2020 Winter Star champion, and the 2021 Belarusian national champion. They competed in the final segment at the 2021 World Championships

Lukashevich/Stepanov represented Russia until switching to Belarus in June 2020.

Programs 
 With Lukashevich

Competitive highlights 
CS: Challenger Series; JGP: Junior Grand Prix

With Lukashevich 
 For Belarus

 For Russia

Men's singles for Russia

Detailed results 
ISU Personal Best highlighted in bold.

 With Lukashevich

For Belarus

For Russia

References

External links 
 
 

1991 births
Living people
Russian male pair skaters
Belarusian male pair skaters
Russian emigrants to Belarus
Figure skaters from Moscow